Marcion is Coptic–English/Czech dictionary related to Crum's coptic dictionary,  written in C++,  based on MySQL, with Qt GUI.  It contains many coptic texts, grammars, Greek texts, Liddell–Scott Greek–English lexicon, and others, and can be used as a bible study tool. Marcion is free software released under the GNU GPL.

References

External links

 

Free dictionary software
Software that uses Qt
Language software
Christian software